Eduardo Gonzalo Ramírez (born 25 August 1983 in Mataro) is a Spanish former road racing cyclist, who competed professionally between 2006 and 2011 for the ,  and  teams.

In 2005, he won the overall rankings of the under-23 Tour de l'Isard d'Ariège. A year later he signed his first professional contract when he joined . He won two stages in minor races in 2006 and made his Tour de France debut that same year finishing in 117th position. In 2007 he made his second Tour appearance, but was forced to withdraw after stage one due to a collarbone injury. Early in the stage he crashed into the back windscreen of a  team car.

Major results

2005
 1st Overall Ronde de l'Isard
1st Mountains classification
 4th Overall Giro delle Regioni
2006
 2nd Overall Rhône-Alpes Isère Tour
1st Stage 3
 3rd Overall Circuit de Lorraine
1st Stage 3
 9th Classic Loire Atlantique
2007
 1st Mountains classification Les 3 Jours de Vaucluse
 3rd Overall Circuit de Lorraine
 9th Overall Clásica Internacional de Alcobendas
2008
 6th Overall Tour Méditerranéen
2009
 7th Overall Route du Sud
 7th GP Triberg-Schwarzwald
2010
 7th Overall Circuit de Lorraine
 8th Tour du Finistère
 10th Overall Circuit des Ardennes
 10th Les Boucles du Sud Ardèche

References

 Tour de France 2007 Stage 1 Report

1983 births
Living people
Spanish male cyclists
People from Mataró
Sportspeople from the Province of Barcelona
Cyclists from Catalonia
21st-century Spanish people